Guiding County is a county of south-central Guizhou, People's Republic of China. It is under the administration of the Qiannan Buyei and Miao Autonomous Prefecture. The county seat is located in the town of Chengguan.

The town of Changmingzhen (昌明镇) has a Laoganma factory that opened during the COVID-19 pandemic in China.

Transportation

Rail
 Guizhou–Guangxi Railway

Climate

References

External links
Official website of Guiding County government

County-level divisions of Guizhou
Qiannan Buyei and Miao Autonomous Prefecture